Apricot is a fruit from several tree species in family Rosaceae, and the trees that bear them.

Apricot may also refer to:
 Briançon apricot, Prunus brigantina
 Desert apricot, Prunus fremontii
 Pittosporum angustifolium, Australian native tree
 Apricot (color)
APRICOT (conference)
 Apricot Computers 
 ACT Computer Apricot
 Value womenswear retailer in the United Kingdom
 Yo Frankie! (code named "Project Apricot"), an open content video game by the Blender Foundation (2008) 
 Slang for the Medulla oblongata, the part of the brain sometimes used as a target by snipers
 Tropical apricot, several plants

See also
 Project Apricot (disambiguation)